Pinnacle West Capital Corporation is an American utility holding company that owns Arizona Public Service and Bright Canyon Energy. It is publicly traded on the New York Stock exchange and a component of the S&P 500 stock market index.

History 

In February 1985, Arizona Public Service Company reorganized as a holding company, AZP Group Inc., with APS as the leading subsidiary. It traded under the ticker symbol AZP. 1985 earnings reached a new record high at almost US$290 million, and by the end of the year the stock price had doubled from its 1984 low.

In 1987, AZP Group changed its name to Pinnacle West Capital Corporation, and began trading under the new ticker symbol PNW. The utility continued to operate as its principal subsidiary. By then Pinnacle's long-term debt had grown to almost US$2.4 billion. Earnings had declined to US$260 million in 1986, but were recovering by the end 1987. However, the stock price reached an all-time peak that year, which was not surpassed for the next decade, as the company ran into troubles through the early 1990s.  In 1986, Pinnacle acquired MeraBank, a savings and loan.  It grew to become Arizona's largest thrift, with $6.5 billion in assets.  However, the thrift was seized by federal regulators in January 1990, due in part to the deterioration in prices in the Arizona real estate market.

By 1990, the company's earnings had fallen to under US$100 million, as it struggled through the 1990-1991 recession, as well as a series of failed attempts to diversify. By 1991, the company was facing a loss of almost US$190 million, and discontinued paying its dividend. APS and its predecessors had paid a dividend without interruption since 1920. The stock price plunged 85% from its 1987 peak, to its lowest level in over twenty years. Its long-term debt by then reached over US$2.5 billion.

However, by 1992, the company returned to profitability, as earnings  recovered to over US$150 million. The stock price tripled from its 1991 low by the end of 1993. The company reinstated its dividend that year.

By 1995, Pinnacle West Capital had been added to the S&P MidCap 400 index. That year, earnings surpassed US$200 million again, and by early the next year the stock price began approaching its old 1987 high. Also in 1995, the utility subsidiary Arizona Public Services issued 30-year Monthly Income Debt Securities paying 10%.

References

External links 

Companies listed on the New York Stock Exchange
American companies established in 1985
Arizona Public Service